12 Metre European Championship is a European Championship sailing regatta in the 12 Metre class organised by the International 12 Metre Association.

Editions

Medalists

References

12 Metre competitions
European championships in sailing